Qaderabad (also Romanized as Qāderābād; also known as Qāderābād-e Pā’īn) is a village in Chahdegal Rural District, Negin Kavir District, Fahraj County, Kerman Province, Iran. At the 2006 census, its population was 46, in 12 families.

References 

Populated places in Fahraj County